KTCS (branded as ‘’simulcasting KTCS FM on AM 1410'') is a radio station serving the Fort Smith metropolitan area with a New Country format.  The station broadcasts on AM frequency 1410 kHz and is currently under ownership of Big Chief Broadcasting Co. "

External links

TCS